Levon Maxwell Simon Kendall (born July 4, 1984) is a Canadian-Irish professional basketball player who currently plays for Movistar Estudiantes of the Liga ACB. He plays at both power forward and center. He is 2.09 m (6 ft 10 ¼ in) in height. His father is the Canadian rock musician and composer Simon Kendall.

High school
Kendall led his Kitsilano Blue Demons high school team to three straight provincial championships under coach Simon Dykstra. Kendall was twice named MVP and was instrumental in leading his team to victory alongside fellow standout Chris Burton.

College career
Kendall played college basketball with the University of Pittsburgh's men's basketball team the Pittsburgh Panthers.

Professional career
In 2007, Kendall joined the pro Greek League club Panionios. In 2009, he moved to the Greek club Maroussi. In 2010, he moved to the ACB League in Spain, in CAB Obradoiro. In August 2013, he signed with German team Alba Berlin.

National team career
Kendall is a member of the Canadian national basketball team. He was a member of the Canadian team that competed at the 2008 FIBA World Olympic Qualifying Tournament and the 2010 FIBA World Championship team.

References

External links
Euroleague.net Profile
Eurobasket.com Profile
Pitt Panthers Bio

1984 births
Living people
2010 FIBA World Championship players
Alba Berlin players
Basketball players from Vancouver
Canadian expatriate basketball people in Germany
Canadian expatriate basketball people in Greece
Canadian expatriate basketball people in Spain
Canadian expatriate basketball people in the United States
Canadian men's basketball players
Canadian people of Irish descent
CB Estudiantes players
CB Gran Canaria players
Centers (basketball)
Greek Basket League players
Liga ACB players
Maroussi B.C. players
Obradoiro CAB players
Panionios B.C. players
Pittsburgh Panthers men's basketball players
Power forwards (basketball)